Topčider railway station is a historical railway station in Belgrade, capital of Serbia. It is located in the large Topčider park, south of the city center. Having been defunct for more than 30 years, it underwent a partial renovation in 2018 in order to support relocation of long distance motorail services on the Belgrade–Bar railway, following the closing of the Belgrade Main railway station. The station was again closed for passengers on 1 October 2021.

History 

The station building was built in 1884, at the location where prince Milan Obrenović IV marked the origin of the future Belgrade–Niš railway. It was designed as an auxiliary station, serving up to 10,000 passengers in summer months. During the World War I, it briefly took over the role of city's main station, but was destroyed by a bomb. Following a reconstruction in the 1931, a royal waiting room was appended, in order to cater for high guests of the Beli dvor royal complex in the vicinity. It was again destroyed during the World War II (it was bombed in 1941), and only the royal waiting room wing survived, which took over the role of the passenger hall. After the war, it served as a home station and garage for the famous Blue Train of Yugoslav leader Josip Broz Tito, who resided in the former royal palace. After Tito's death, the station hosted a small historical exhibition. It was also used as a filming location.

2018 revitalization 

In the early 2016, a gradual moving of trains from the Belgrade Main railway station to the new Belgrade Centre railway station, colloquially called Prokop station began. In December 2017, all but two national trains were relocated to "Belgrade Center".

However, problems arose immediately. The Prokop is still not finished, has no station building nor proper access roads and public transportation connections with the rest of the city. Additionally, it has no facilities for loading and unloading cars from the car shuttle trains nor was ever planned to have one. Still, in January 2018 it was announced that the Belgrade Main station will be completely closed for traffic, which finally happened on 1 July 2018, even though none of the projects needed for a complete removal of the railway traffic were finished: Prokop is incomplete, the projected main freight station in Zemun is not being adapted at all while there is even no project on a Belgrade railway beltway so a series of temporary solutions had to be applied. One was a defunct and deteriorated Topčider station, which was partially revitalized and adapted for the car shuttle trains until the freight station Zemun is finished. Topčider station has several flaws, including a bad public transportation connection (only one tram line, No. 3), so the state railway company asked officially for this problem to be solved. The deadline for the Zemun station was set at two years, but the work is not scheduled to begin until the end of 2018. Around  (€330,000 ) has been invested into renovation of salons and adaptation of the ticket office, waiting room and public toilets. Access ramps, parking lot, tram station and pedestrian crossings have also been adapted and the info board was placed.

Two intermittent lines of public transportation were added, tram No. 3L and bus No. 38A, but the complaints from the passengers that the station is simply not adequate continued. Still, in July 2018 more trains were transferred to the station: international trains to Thessaloniki and Sofia and the tourist line "Romantika", to Sremski Karlovci.

By June 2021, the station remained hard to reach, and the passengers kept being confused. Instead of Prokop or Topčider, the New Belgrade railway station de facto took over the role of the main station, despite being as inadequately equipped. It turned out to be the busiest one, with better connections with other parts of the city and way more accessible. The Topčider station was closed for passengers again on 1 October 2021 and all lines were rerouted to Prokop, leaving the city without a facility to load cars as the Zemun freight station still wasn't finished.

See also 
 Serbian Railways
 BG Voz

References

External links
 

Railway stations in Belgrade